The Gulf tree gehyra (Gehyra lauta) is a species of gecko, also known as the ghost gecko. It is endemic to Queensland, and to the Northern Territory in Australia.

References

lauta
Geckos of Australia
Endemic fauna of Australia
Reptiles described in 2020
Taxa named by Paul M. Oliver
Taxa named by Leonardo G. Tedeschi
Taxa named by Ryan J. Ellis
Taxa named by Paul Doughty
Taxa named by Craig Moritz